Trichoplein keratin filament-binding protein is a protein that in humans is encoded by the TCHP gene.

Model organisms 

Model organisms have been used in the study of TCHP function. A conditional knockout mouse line called Tchptm1a(EUCOMM)Wtsi was generated at the Wellcome Trust Sanger Institute. Male and female animals underwent a standardized phenotypic screen to determine the effects of deletion. Additional screens performed:  - In-depth immunological phenotyping

References

Further reading